The Minister of Foreign Affairs is the foreign minister of Ukraine and head of the Ministry of Foreign Affairs, which is in charge of the diplomatic corps and realization of the foreign policy of Ukraine. The Minister of Foreign Affairs is appointed by the President.

Since Ukrainian independence from the Soviet Union in 1991, the nation has had 14 foreign ministers (not including acting ones). During the Ukrainian chairmanship of the Organization for Security and Co-operation in Europe in 2013, the Ukrainian foreign minister at that time (Leonid Kozhara) served as Chairman-in-Office of the OSCE.

The current foreign minister is Dmytro Kuleba, who took office on 4 March 2020.

List of Ministers of Foreign Affairs

Soviet Ukraine

Ministers after Independence

References

Foreign Affairs
Foreign Affairs
National Security and Defense Council of Ukraine